The Oromia Special Zone Surrounding Addis Ababa  is a zone in Oromia Region of Ethiopia that surrounds Addis Ababa (also known as Finfine: literally "natural spring", in the Amharic language). It was created in 2008 from parts of North Shewa Zone, East Shewa Zone, Southwest Shewa zone and West Shewa Zones. The zone was created to support the cooperation and development of the surrounding areas of Addis Ababa, and to control the urban sprawl of this city on the lands of Oromia. The administrative center of this zone is in Addis Ababa (Finfinne). The districts and town in this zone include Akaki, Bereh, Burayu, Dubra, Holeta Town, Koye Feche, Mulo, Sebeta Hawas, Sebeta Town, Sendafa Town, Sululta, Walmara, Laga Xafo Laga Dadhi, Galaan, Sebeta Hawas (Town) and Dukem.

Demographics 

As the special zone was created after the census of 2007, it is hard to find correct data about its population. The estimated population size according to the 2007 census conducted by the CSA is 794,489, of which 228,420 or 28.75% were urban dwellers.

Notes

References 

Oromia Region
Zones of Ethiopia